The Khaibar-1 , also known as the Khyber-1, the M-302, or the B-302 is a Syrian-made 302 mm unguided artillery rocket. It is best known for being used by Hezbollah against targets in northern Israel during the 2006 Lebanon War, and has also been used in the Syrian Civil War. It is essentially a clone of the Chinese WS-1 rocket.

The Khaibar-1 is significant because the rocket has a 100 km range, longer than the BM-21 Grad rockets that make up most of the Hezbollah rocket force. It uses a unique Syrian-designed launcher and possibly a cluster munition or fragmentation warhead. The rocket is easily recognizable by its fixed tail fins.

The rocket is often misidentified as Iranian or as a variant of Iranian Fajr-3 or Fajr-5 rockets.

Usage

The rocket's first use was being fired at the Israeli city of Afula during the 2006 Lebanon War. In early August 2006, Khaibar-1 rockets were reported to hit Beit Shean, about 70 km south of the Lebanese border, Hadera, and Haifa, Israel's third-largest city.

Iran has attempted to ship the Khaibar-1 rocket to Gaza as well.

Origin of the name
Khaibar, also spelled Khaybar, is an oasis approximately 95 miles east of Medina, which was once the largest Jewish settlement in Arabia. The name was chosen as a reminder of the Battle of Khaybar, a battle that took place in 629 between Muhammad and his followers against the Jewish people who inhabited the settlement. The name of the rocket was first revealed on July 28, 2006 by Hezbollah leader Hassan Nasrallah in a speech on Al-Manar television station.

See also
2006 Lebanon War
Weishi Rockets on which the Khaibar-1 is based.

References

Tactical ballistic missiles
Hezbollah rocket systems
Weapons of Syria